Terri Raines Irwin  (née Raines, born July 20, 1964) is an American-Australian conservationist, television personality and author who is the owner of Australia Zoo in Beerwah, Queensland. She is the widow of Steve Irwin.

Born in Oregon, she began working for an independent animal rehabilitation center for injured predator mammals at the age of 22 while working for her family's trucking business. While touring wildlife rehabilitation facilities in Australia in 1991, she had a chance meeting with Irwin. The two married in 1992, and went on to co-star in The Crocodile Hunter, their unconventional television nature documentary series and its spin-off series, Croc Files, The Crocodile Hunter Diaries, and Crikey! It's the Irwins. They had two children, Bindi and Robert, before Steve's death in 2006 from a stingray injury while filming an underwater documentary.

Following Steve's death, Terri became a naturalised Australian citizen in 2009. She and her two children continue to operate Australia Zoo.

Early life
Theresa Penelope Raines was born in Eugene, Oregon, United States, the youngest of three daughters of environmentalist parents, Clarence and Judy Raines. Commenting on her childhood, she said, "My friends and I were truly 'free-range kids.' Summers were spent bicycling around Alton Baker Park or hiking up Spencer Butte in the hopes of catching a glimpse of one of the shy rattlesnakes that sought refuge in the rock escarpments. Winters were spent hoping the Willamette Valley would get snow."

Her family owned a long-haul trucking business and, during her childhood, her father constantly brought home injured animals from the highways on which his trucks traveled; this eventually instilled in her an ongoing commitment to saving and rehabilitating wild animals. While working in the family business in 1986, she started a rehabilitation facility called Cougar Country to re-educate and release predator mammals such as foxes, raccoons, bears, bobcats, and cougars back into the wild. Soon she was handling 300 animals each year.

Career
Terri joined an emergency veterinary hospital in 1989 as a veterinary technician to gain further knowledge on the care and support to all kinds of animals. Her life was very busy, as she was still helping her father run the family business, rehabilitating animals through her Cougar Country, and working at the vet hospital. In addition, she had 15 cats of her own, several birds, and a dog.

In 1991, Terri went on a tour of Australia, and while visiting wildlife rehabilitation facilities, she had a chance meeting with Steve Irwin, whose father had founded the Australia Zoo (as Beerwah Reptile and Fauna Park). Steve would later say that "it was love at first sight." A "whirlwind romance" followed: They were engaged after only four months and, eight months later, on June 4, 1992, they married in Eugene, Oregon. Their first television documentary was filmed on their honeymoon. The footage, shot by John Stainton, became the first episode of The Crocodile Hunter, which later became successful in the US.

The couple settled in Australia shortly after their wedding, with Terri leaving her Cougar Country project behind in the US. However, as a partner in their wildlife enterprises and television shows, she believes she was able to do far greater work on behalf of wildlife conservation.

In addition to their two popular television programs shown on the Animal Planet television network in the US, in 2002, the Irwins released a feature film, The Crocodile Hunter: Collision Course.

In 2018, the series Crikey! It's the Irwins began airing, which focuses on the lives of Terri and her children at Australia Zoo.

Personal life

Marriage to Steve Irwin

Terri met Steve Irwin in Australia in 1991. The couple married in her home state of Oregon in 1992 before returning to live in Australia. The Irwins had two children: daughter Bindi on July 24, 1998, and son Robert on December 1, 2003. In an interview before the birth of their second child, Terri Irwin had this to say about her marriage and working with her husband Steve:

Irwin and her children were reportedly trekking in Cradle Mountain, Tasmania, on the morning of September 4, 2006, when Steve died after sustaining heart injuries from a short-tail stingray barb that pierced his chest. He was filming an underwater documentary at the time at Batt Reef near Port Douglas in Queensland. In her first statement after her husband's death, Irwin announced that the Australian memorial service (on September 20, 2006, at Australia Zoo in Queensland) would be open to the public, and that people who wished to attend should make a donation to Irwin's "Wildlife Warriors" fund. The service was held at the "Crocoseum," a 5,500-seat open-air amphitheater, which Steve had built at the zoo and which she had chosen over any larger facility. She also thanked well-wishers for their "overwhelming outpouring of love, support and prayers for [her] family." Terri herself was seemingly too upset to speak at the ceremony. She remained with her son, Robert, during the proceedings, but daughter Bindi spoke about her love for her father, for which she received a standing ovation.

Australian TV network Channel 9 screened an interview between Irwin and local presenter Ray Martin, on September 27, at 8:30pm on the station. During the interview, she said, "And I'll make Australia Zoo bigger. I'll make it bigger . . . because I promised." Barbara Walters held an interview with Irwin on The View, which aired September 27 in the US.

On October 31, 2006, Irwin was invited to the Royal Albert Hall to present a Special Recognition Award to Sir David Attenborough at the British National Television Awards. When she came on stage, the entire audience gave her a standing ovation. Irwin fought back tears, while the camera cut to Neighbours star Alan Fletcher, who was shown to be also fighting back tears. She cited Attenborough as a great inspiration for her husband, saying, "If there's one person, other than his father, who directly inspired my husband, it's the person being honoured tonight," and going on to say "[Steve's] real, true love was conservation – and the influence of tonight's recipient in preserving the natural world has been immense."

Attenborough reciprocated by praising her husband for introducing many people to the natural world, saying, "He taught them how wonderful and exciting it was; he was a born communicator." Terri published a memoir, My Steve, about her relationship and marriage with Steve Irwin, in 2007.

On January 3, 2007, the only video footage showing the events that led to Steve Irwin's death was handed over to Terri, who said the video would never become public, and noted that her family has not seen the video either.  In a January 11, 2007, interview with Access Hollywood, Terri said "all footage has been destroyed."  On March 2, 2008, it was announced that Bob Irwin, father of Steve Irwin, had resigned from Australia Zoo, of which he was the founder, in order to "keep his son's dream alive" on a different property with his wife. In a statement to the press, the elder Irwin thanked the staff for all their help but made no mention of Terri. At that time, the zoo was being sued for $2.5 million by a debt collection agency, but the lawsuit was later dismissed by the court.

In a 2018 interview, Terri told People magazine that she had not dated or had a relationship since her husband's death. "There's always the potential to find love again, and that's a beautiful thing . . . but I had my happily ever after," she said, "[so] I'm doing OK."

Citizenship
American by birth, Terri became an Australian citizen on November 15, 2009. In a tribute to her husband Steve, the citizenship ceremony was held during the Steve Irwin Day celebrations in Australia Zoo's Crocoseum.

Conservation support
Irwin has expressed support for the Sea Shepherd Conservation Society and was present at the launching of one of the organization's vessels, which was renamed after her husband.

In 2008, she signed on to a three-year research program in correspondence with Australia Zoo supporting the Marine Mammal Institute at Oregon State University, funding two US$250,000 research projects on humpback whales. "Learning about whales is part of a bigger picture," she said of the project. "Our oceans are in jeopardy and the more research we gather about whales, the more knowledge we have to help us save, protect and preserve our delicate oceans."

Honours
In 2006, Irwin was made an honorary Member of the Order of Australia for services to wildlife conservation and the tourism industry.
(Honorary of the Order of Australia is the appointment rank to non-citizens of Australia; this became a substantive appointment when she became an Australian citizen in 2009.)

Irwin won the 2007 Queensland Telstra Business Women's Award.

She has been awarded an honorary doctorate by the University of Queensland for her work in conservation and support of high-quality research.

In 2014, Irwin was a Queensland finalist for Australian of the Year.

Filmography

Bibliography

References

External links

The Irwins' website, The Crocodile Hunter

Terri Irwin interview
 Animal Planet profile of Terri Irwin

1964 births
American conservationists
American emigrants to Australia
American naturalists
American television personalities
American women television personalities
Australian conservationists
Australian naturalists
Australian television personalities
Terri
Living people
Members of the Order of Australia
Naturalised citizens of Australia
Writers from Eugene, Oregon
People with acquired Australian citizenship
Steve Irwin
Zoo owners